Koe Yeet is a Malaysian television and film actress.

Early life and education 
Koe Yeet began her education at Jalan Davidson Chinese primary school and completed her secondary education at the Catholic High School, Petaling Jaya. In 2016, Koe received a Bachelor of Laws degree from the University of Reading and advanced to the Bar Professional Training Course.

Career 
Koe was noted her role in the 2008 action comedy film Ah Long Pte Ltd by actor-director Jack Neo. She also starred in Wind Chimes In A Bakery; a web series sponsored by Samsung Malaysia which has received a total of 4.7 million views.

In 2020, Koe played the main character in Titoudao, a television adaptation of the eponymously named play. For the role, she received the Best Newcomer award at Asia Content Awards 2021.

Filmography

Television and web series

Television and short films

Theatrical films

Music videos

Advertisements

References

External links 
 
 Koe Yeet on Facebook

1992 births
Living people
Malaysian child actresses
Malaysian film actresses
People from Selangor